John Clowes may refer to:
 John Clowes (footballer), English footballer
 John Clowes (priest), English cleric and fellow of Trinity College, Cambridge
 Johnny Clowes (John Alexander Clowes), American football player
 Jack Clowes (John William Preston Clowes), American-born British rugby union player